Pseudomyrmex elongatus is a species of ant in the family Formicidae.

This is widely spread and common species from Mexico to Argentina. Long eyes, predominantly opaque head, small size (HW 0.56-0.68) these are some features of P. elongatus.

References

Further reading

External links

 

Pseudomyrmecinae
Articles created by Qbugbot
Insects described in 1870